Imaclava is a genus of sea snails, marine gastropod mollusks in the family Drilliidae.

Species
Species within the genus Imaclava include:
 Imaclava asaedai (Hertlein & Strong, 1951)
 Imaclava hotei (Otuka, 1949)
 Imaclava ima Bartsch, 1944
 Imaclava pembertoni (H.N. Lowe, 1935)
 Imaclava pilsbryi Bartsch, 1950
 Imaclava unimaculata (Sowerby I, 1834)
Species brought into synonymy
 Imaclava hosoi Okutani, 1964: synonym of  Crassispira hosoi (Okutani, 1964)

References

 
Gastropod genera